Laura La Varnie (March 2, 1853 – September 18, 1939) was an American actress of the silent era. She appeared in more than 80 films between 1913 and 1930. She was born in Jefferson City, Missouri and died in Los Angeles, California.

Selected filmography

 Lord Chumley (1914)
 The Pullman Bride (1917)
 Mickey (1918)
 The Unpainted Woman (1919)
 The Grim Comedian (1921)
 Skirts (1921)
 The Old Nest (1921) as Mrs. Guthrie
 The Marriage Chance (1922)
 Vanity Fair (1923)
 Mine to Keep (1923)
The Love Trap (1923)
 The Self-Made Wife (1923)
 Poisoned Paradise: The Forbidden Story of Monte Carlo (1924)
 The Bells (1926)
 Raggedy Rose (1926) - her mother
 The Honorable Mr. Buggs (1927)
 The Devil's Holiday (1930)

References

External links

1853 births
1939 deaths
American film actresses
American silent film actresses
People from Jefferson City, Missouri
20th-century American actresses
Actresses from Missouri